F3 or F03 may refer to:

Computing 
 F3, a function key on a computer keyboard
 F3 (language), the working name for JavaFX Script, a scripting language
 Fat-Free Framework, a PHP web application framework

Military 
 Douglas F-3 Havoc, a photographic reconnaissance plane
 Douglas F3D Skyknight (later F-10 Skyknight), a Douglas twin engine, mid-wing jet fighter
 F 3 Malmslätt, a former Swedish Air Force unit
 Felixstowe F.3, a 1917 British First World War flying boat
 Hannover F.3, a World War I German prototype escort fighter 
 HMS Cossack (F03), a 1937 British Royal Navy destroyer
 HMS F3, a British F class submarine
 McDonnell F3H Demon (later F-3 Demon), a United States Navy carrier-based jet fighter
 Mk F3 155mm, French self-propelled gun
 RAF Tornado F3, a British fighter
 USS F-3 (SS-22), a United States Navy submarine
 A future Japanese fighter jet (F-3 or F-X) based on the  i3 conceptual jet fighter and Mitsubishi X-2 prototype

Transportation 
 BYD F3, an automobile
 EMD F3, a North American cab-style diesel locomotive introduced in 1945
 F3 (Istanbul Metro), a funicular railway line in Istanbul, Turkey
 F3 class, project name for the mega-cruise ship Norwegian Epic
 Faso Airways IATA airline designator
 Fokker F.III, a 1921 Dutch single-engine high-winged monoplane aircraft
 Hinterhoeller F3, a yacht design by Canadian boat builder Hinterhoeller Yachts
 MV Agusta F3 series, an Italian sports motorcycle
 Spyder F3, a model of the  three-wheeled motorcycle BRP Can-Am Spyder Roadster
 Sydney Ferries' Parramatta River ferry services, known as the F3
 Pacific Motorway (Sydney–Newcastle), formerly Sydney–Newcastle Freeway and commonly known as F3
 LNER Class F3, a class of British steam locomotives

Arts 
 F3 (Fisz Emade jako Tworzywo Sztuczne album)
 F3 (manga) (F³: Frantic, Frustrated & Female), a hentai manga series
 F3 (film), an Indian Telugu-language film

Other 
 F3 (classification), a wheelchair sport classification
 F3 (font format), created by Folio, Inc
 F3 (gene), a protein
 F3 isoprostane
 F3 Nation, a network of free peer-led workouts for men in the U.S.
 Form, fit and function, an engineering term relating to design processes
 Formula Three, a class of automobile racing
 Forsmark 3, a unit at Forsmark Nuclear Power Plant, Sweden
 Motorola Motofone F3, a mobile phone
 Nikon F3, an SLR camera
 Taito F3 System, a 1992 arcade system board
 A tornado intensity rating on the Fujita scale
F3, a type of formant in speech science
 F3, an EEG electrode site according to the 10-20 system
 F3 Derby, association football rivalry between Central Coast Mariners and Newcastle Jets